Emperor Tomato Ketchup may refer to:
 Emperor Tomato Ketchup (film), a 1970 Japanese film directed by Shūji Terayama
 L'Empereur Tomato-Ketchup, a 1986 single by the French punk group Bérurier Noir
 Emperor Tomato Ketchup (album), a 1996 album by UK band Stereolab